Mohammad Gholi Majd, also known as M.G. Madjd, is an author whose primary field of work is modern history of Iran.

Majd obtained a PhD in agricultural economics from Cornell University in 1978, and was a visiting lecturer at the Middle East Center, University of Pennsylvania from 1988 to 1993.

Bibliography

Books

Other published works

References

Reviews of works 

1964 births
Living people
Cornell University College of Agriculture and Life Sciences alumni
Iranian historians